The May Bumps 2018 were a set of rowing races at Cambridge University from Wednesday 13 June 2018 to Saturday 16 June 2018. The event was run as a bumps race and was the 127th set of races in the series of May Bumps which have been held annually in mid-June in this form since 1887.

The 2018 May Bumps saw the first ever quadruple overbump in the men's divisions, which involved  bumping  on the second day, having started nine stations (21½ lengths) behind them.

Head of the River crews
  men rowed over on all four days to retain the headship they won in 2016.

  women rowed over on all four days to retain the headship they won in 2017.

Highest 2nd VIIIs

 Despite being bumped on every day of the campaign,  retained their status as the highest placed women's second VIII, finishing 3rd overall in the W2 division.

Links to races in other years

Bumps Charts

Below are the bumps charts for all 5 men's and all 4 women's divisions, with the men's event on the left and women's event on the right. The bumps chart shows the progress of every crew over all four days of the racing. To follow the progress of any particular crew, find the crew's name on the left side of the chart and follow the line to the end-of-the-week finishing position on the right of the chart.

This chart may not be displayed correctly if you are using a large font size on your browser. A simple way to check is to see that the first horizontal bold line, marking the boundary between divisions, lies between positions 17 and 18.

References 

2018 in rowing
May Bumps results
2018 in English sport